Tim Maloney is an American filmmaker and animator who has made films for the band Negativland, the Walt Disney Company, and the Los Angeles County Museum of Art.

He is the creator of Cat-Head Theatre, which is included in the DVD compilation of animated short films, God Hates Cartoons. He is a producer for the company that released that DVD, Bright Red Rocket. He also produced, edited and composed music for The Naked Cosmos, a 4-part TV show directed and starring Gilbert Hernandez, co-creator of "Love and Rockets."

In 2008, Tim Maloney wrote "Get Animated! Creating Professional Cartoon Animation on Your Home Computer."  In it, Maloney aims to share his low budget, lone wolf secrets to getting high quality animation out of everyday equipment and software.  This book, published by Watson-Guptill, contains a DVD with tutorials and other information to support the material in the book.

Tim Maloney teaches film at California State University, Fullerton.

References

The Droplift Project at "Some Assembly Required."
Tim Maloney listed as director for "Mrs. Munger's Class" at IMDB
"Gimme the Mermaid" Review

External links
The Naked Rabbit World Power Foundation (Official web page)
Bright Red Rocket
Negativland

Get Animated at Amazon.com
God Hates Cartoons
"Beat the Heat: How to Handle Encounters with Law Enforcement" by Katya Kamisaruk, illustrated by Tim Maloney

American animators
Living people
Year of birth missing (living people)